Fontenay-en-Vexin (literally Fontenay in Vexin; before 2015: Fontenay) is a former commune in the Eure department in the Normandy region in northern France. On 1 January 2016, it was merged into the new commune of Vexin-sur-Epte.

Population

See also
Communes of the Eure department

References

Former communes of Eure